Walter Beck Wolf (January 5, 1942 – July 7, 2020) was a professional baseball pitcher. He played for two seasons in Major League Baseball for the California Angels, appearing in two games during the 1969 California Angels season and four games during the 1970 California Angels season. He died on July 7, 2020 in Los Angeles, California.

References

External links

Major League Baseball pitchers
California Angels players
Jacksonville Jets players
Houston Buffs players
Durham Bulls players
Oklahoma City 89ers players
San Antonio Bullets players
Macon Peaches players
San Diego Padres (minor league) players
Peninsula Grays players
El Paso Sun Kings players
Seattle Angels players
Hawaii Islanders players
USC Trojans baseball players
Baseball players from California
1942 births
2020 deaths